Kingsland is an unincorporated community in Jefferson Township, Wells County, in the U.S. state of Indiana.

History
A post office was established at Kingsland in 1884, and remained in operation until 1922. An old variant name of the community was called Parkinson.

Geography

References

Unincorporated communities in Wells County, Indiana
Unincorporated communities in Indiana
Fort Wayne, IN Metropolitan Statistical Area